In enzymology, a lysine 2-monooxygenase is an enzyme that catalyzes the chemical reaction

L-lysine + O2  5-aminopentanamide + CO2 + H2O

Thus, the two substrates of this enzyme are L-lysine and O2, whereas its 3 products are 5-aminopentanamide, CO2, and H2O.

This enzyme belongs to the family of oxidoreductases, specifically those acting on single donors with O2 as oxidant and incorporation of two atoms of oxygen into the substrate (oxygenases). The oxygen incorporated need not be derived from O with incorporation of one atom of oxygen (internal monooxygenases o internal mixed-function oxidases).  The systematic name of this enzyme class is L-lysine:oxygen 2-oxidoreductase (decarboxylating). Other names in common use include lysine oxygenase, lysine monooxygenase, and L-lysine-2-monooxygenase.  This enzyme participates in lysine degradation.  It employs one cofactor, FAD.

References

 
 
 

EC 1.13.12
Flavoproteins
Enzymes of unknown structure